Hungary competed at the 2000 Summer Olympics in Sydney, Australia. 178 competitors, 109 men and 69 women, took part in 137 events in 23 sports.

Medalists

Athletics

Men's Competition
Men's 400 m
 Zsolt Szeglet
 Round 1 – 46.19 (→ did not advance)

Men's 800 m
 Balázs Korányi
 Round 1 – 01:46.21
 Semifinal – 01:47.35 (→ did not advance)

Men's 110 m Hurdles
 Balázs Kovács
 Round 1 – 13.83
 Round 2 – 13.78 (→ did not advance)

 Levente Csillag
 Round 1 – 13.66
 Round 2 – 13.75 (→ did not advance)

Men's 400 m Hurdles
 Tibor Bedi
 Round 1 – 51.54 (→ did not advance)

Men's 4 × 100 m
 Laszlo Babaly, Miklós Gyulai, Viktor Kovács, and Géza Pauer
 Round 1 – 39.52 (did not advance)

Men's 4 × 400 m
 Tibor Bedi, Zétény Dombi, Attila Kilvinger, and Zsolt Szeglet
 Round 1 – 03:06.50 (→ did not advance)

Men's Shot Put
 Szilard Kiss
 Qualifying – 18.95 (→ did not advance)

Men's Discus
 Róbert Fazekas
 Qualifying – 61.76 (→ did not advance)

 Gábor Máté
 Qualifying – 60.86 (→ did not advance)

 Zoltán Kővágó
 Qualifying – NM (→ did not advance)

Men's Hammer Throw
 Tibor Gécsek
 Qualifying – 77.33
 Final – 77.70 (→ 7th place)

 Zsolt Németh
 Qualifying – 73.95 (→ did not advance)

 Adrián Annus
 Qualifying – 75.41 (→ did not advance)

Men's Triple Jump
 Zsolt Czingler
 Qualifying – 16.52 (→ did not advance)

Men's 20 km Walk
 Sándor Urbanik
 Final – 0:01:26 (→ 29th place)

 Gyula Dudás
 Final – 1:28:34 (→ 37th place)

Men's 50 km Walk
 Gyula Dudás
 Final – 4:17:55 (→ 37th place)

 Zoltán Czukor
 Final – DSQ

Men's Decathlon
 Attila Zsivoczky
 100 m – 11.10
 Long jump – 7.00
 Shot put – 14.96
 High jump – 2.06
 400 m – 48.61
 100 m Hurdles – 15.27
 Discus throw – 47.43
 Pole vault – 4.80
 Javelin throw – 65.87
 1,500 m – 04:23.37
 Points – 8277.00 (→ 8th place)
 Zsolt Kürtösi
 100 m – 11.00
 Long jump – 7.19
 Shot put – 15.13
 High jump – 2.00
 400 m – 48.81
 100 m Hurdles – 14.15
 Discus throw – 46.62
 Pole vault – 4.80
 Javelin throw – 57.16
 1,500 m – 04:43.39
 Points – 8149.00 (→ 11th place)

Women's Competition
Women's 400 m
 Barbara Petráhn
 Round 1 – 52.86
 Round 2 – 52.72 (→ did not advance)

Women's 10,000 m
 Anikó Kálovics
 Round 1 – 33:20.40 (→ did not advance)

Women's Javelin Throw
 Nikolett Szabó
 Qualifying – 58.86 (→ did not advance)

Women's Hammer Throw
 Katalin Divós
 Qualifying – 62.74 (→ did not advance)

Women's Long Jump
 Tünde Vaszi
 Qualifying – 6.70
 Final – 6.59 (→ 8th place)

 Zita Ajkler
 Qualifying – 6.36 (→ did not advance)

Women's High Jump
 Dóra Győrffy
 Qualifying – 1.89 (→ did not advance)

Women's Pole Vault
 Zsuzsanna Szabó
 Qualifying – NM (→ did not advance)

 Katalin Donath
 Qualifying – NM (→ did not advance)

Women's 20 km Walk
 Mária Urbanik
 Final – 1:34:45 (→ 18th place)

 Anikó Szebenszky
 Final – 1:36:46 (→ 29th place)

Women's Marathon
 Judit Földing-Nagy
 Final – 2:30:54 (→ 17th place)

Women's Heptathlon
 Rita Ináncsi
 100 m Hurdles – 15.11
 High jump – 1.69
 Shot put – DNS
 200 m – DNS

Boxing

Men's Light Flyweight (– 48 kg)
Pál Lakatos
Round 1 – Bye 
Round 2 – Lost to Un Chol Kim of DPR of Korea (→ did not advance)

Men's Light Middleweight (– 71 kg)
Károly Balzsay
Round 1 – Bye 
Round 2 – Lost to Pornchai Thongburan of Thailand (→ did not advance)

Men's Middleweight (– 75 kg)
Zsolt Erdei
Round 1 – Bye 
Round 2 – Defeated Vladislav Vizilter of Kyrgyzstan
Quarterfinal – Defeated Oleksandr Zubrihin of Ukraine
Semifinal – Lost to Gaidarbek Gaidarbekov of Russia → Bronze Medal

Canoeing

Flatwater

Men's Competition
Men's Kayak Singles 500 m
 Ákos Vereckei
 Qualifying heat – 01:42.089
 Semifinal – 01:39.574
 Final – 02:00.145 (→ 4th place)

Men's Kayak Singles 1000 m
 Roland Kökény
 Qualifying heat – 03:38.066
 Semifinal – 03:39.455 (→ did not advance)

Men's Kayak Doubles 500 m
 Zoltan Kammerer and Botond Storcz
 Qualifying heat – 01:31.144
 Semifinal – Bye
 Final – 01:47.055 (→  Gold Medal)

Men's Kayak Doubles 1,000 m
 Krisztián Bártfai and Krisztian Vereb
 Qualifying heat – 03:13.677
 Semifinal – Bye
 Final – 03:16.357 (→  Bronze Medal)

Men's Kayak Fours 1,000 m
 Gabor Horvath, Zoltan Kammerer, Botond Storcz, and Ákos Vereckei
 Qualifying heat – 02:58.096
 Semifinal – Bye
 Final – 02:55.188 (→  Gold Medal)

Men's Canoe Singles 500 m
 Gyorgy Kolonics
 Qualifying heat – 01:51.492
 Semifinal – Bye
 Final – 02:24.813 (→  Gold Medal)

Men's Canoe Singles 1000 m
 György Zala
 Qualifying heat – 04:00.754
 Semifinal – 04:03.226 (→ did not advance)

Men's Canoe Doubles 500 m
 Imre Pulai and Ferenc Novák
 Qualifying heat – 01:42.816
 Semifinal – Bye
 Final – 01:51.284 (→  Gold Medal)

Men's Canoe Doubles 1,000 m
 Imre Pulai and Ferenc Novák
 Qualifying heat – 03:38.492
 Semifinal – Bye
 Final – 03:43.103 (→ 5th place)

Women's Competition
Women's Kayak Singles 500 m
 Rita Kőbán
 Qualifying heat – 01:50.777
 Semifinal – Bye
 Final – 02:19.668 (→ 6th place)

Women's Kayak Doubles 500 m
 Katalin Kovács, Szilvia Szabó
 Qualifying heat – 01:42.298
 Semifinal – Bye
 Final – 01:58.580 (→  Silver Medal)

Women's Kayak Fours 500 m
 Rita Kőbán, Katalin Kovács, Szilvia Szabó, Erzsébet Viski
 Qualifying heat – 01:33.312
 Semifinal – Bye
 Final – 01:34.946 (→  Silver Medal)

Cycling

Track Cycling
Women's Sprint
Szilvia Noemi Szabolcsi
Qualifying – 11.545
1/8 Finals – Lost to Iryna Yanovych of Ukraine
1/8 Finals Repechage – Heat 1; 1st place
Quarterfinal – Lost to Oxana Grichina of Russia
Finals 5-8 – (→ 5th place)

Women's 500 m Time Trial
Szilvia Noemi Szabolcsi
Final – 35.778 (→ 12th place)

Diving

Men's 3 Metre Springboard
 Imre Lengyel
 Preliminary – 382.98
 Semi-final – 222.60 – 605.58
 Final – 390.87 – 613.47 (→ 11th place)

Men's 10 Metre Platform
 Andras Hajinal
 Preliminary – 316.14 (→ did not advance, 34th place)

Women's 3 Metre Springboard
 Orsolya Pintér
 Preliminary – 239.64 (→ did not advance, 25th place)

Fencing

Thirteen fencers, seven men and six women, represented Hungary in 2000.

Men's foil
 Márk Marsi

Men's épée
 Attila Fekete
 Iván Kovács

Men's team épée
 Attila Fekete, Márk Marsi, Iván Kovács

Men's sabre
 Domonkos Ferjancsik
 Csaba Köves
 Zsolt Nemcsik

Men's team sabre
 Zsolt Nemcsik, Csaba Köves, Domonkos Ferjancsik, Péter Takács

Women's foil
 Aida Mohamed
 Edina Knapek
 Gabriella Lantos

Women's team foil
 Edina Knapek, Gabriella Lantos, Aida Mohamed

Women's épée
 Tímea Nagy
 Ildikó Nébaldné Mincza
 Gyöngyi Szalay-Horváth

Women's team épée
 Tímea Nagy, Ildikó Nébaldné Mincza, Gyöngyi Szalay-Horváth

Gymnastics

Handball

Judo

Modern pentathlon

Men's Competition
 Gábor Balogh – 5353pts (→  Silver Medal)
 Péter Sárfalvi – 4971pts (→ 17th place)

Women's Competition
 Zsuzsanna Vörös – 4866 pts (→ 15th place)
 Nóra Simóka – 3042pts (→ 23rd place)

Rhythmic gymnastics

Rowing

Sailing

Five men and one woman competed for Hungary in the Sailing venue at the 2000 Olympics.  The best finish was 15th.

Men's Mistral
 Aron Gadorfalvi
 Race 1 – (24)
 Race 2 – 19 
 Race 3 – 19 
 Race 4 – 23 
 Race 5 – 21 
 Race 6 – 23 
 Race 7 – 21 
 Race 8 – 17 
 Race 9 – 14 
 Race 10 – (37) OCS
 Race 11 – 20 
 Final – 177 (24thplace)

Men's Single Handed Dinghy (Finn)
 Balázs Hajdú
 Race 1 – (26) DSQ
 Race 2 – 6 
 Race 3 – 16 
 Race 4 – 16 
 Race 5 – 3 
 Race 6 – 5 
 Race 7 – (26) DNF
 Race 8 – 8 
 Race 9 – 22 
 Race 10 – 10 
 Race 11 – 16 
 Final – 102 (15th place)

Men's Double Handed Dinghy (470)
 Marcell S. Goszleth and Adam C. Szorenyi
 Race 1 – (30) OCS
 Race 2 – 20 
 Race 3 – 19 
 Race 4 – 18 
 Race 5 – 25 
 Race 6 – 24 
 Race 7 – 26 
 Race 8 – 17 
 Race 9 – (29)
 Race 10 – 28 
 Race 11 – 27 
 Final – 204 (29th place)

Men's Laser
 Tamas Eszes
 Race 1 – 5 
 Race 2 – (26)
 Race 3 – 9 
 Race 4 – 13 
 Race 5 – (44) DSQ
 Race 6 – 14 
 Race 7 – 16 
 Race 8 – 26 
 Race 9 – 5 
 Race 10 – 26 
 Race 11 – 13 
 Final – 127 (18thplace)

Women's Mistral
 Luca Gadorfalvi
 Race 1 – 23 
 Race 2 – (26)
 Race 3 – 24 
 Race 4 – 24 
 Race 5 – (28)
 Race 6 – 21 
 Race 7 – 25 
 Race 8 – 21 
 Race 9 – 15 
 Race 10 – 23 
 Race 11 – 25 
 Final – 201 (25th place)

Shooting

Swimming

Men's 50 m Freestyle
 Attila Zubor
 Preliminary heat – 23.03 (→ did not advance)

Men's 100 m Freestyle
 Attila Zubor
 Preliminary heat – 49.79
 Semi-final – 49.58 (→ did not advance)

Men's 200 m Freestyle
 Béla Szabados
 Preliminary heat – 1:50.10
 Semi-final – 1:49.36 (→ did not advance)

 Attila Zubor
 Preliminary heat – 1:50.11
 Semi-final – 1:49.87 (→ did not advance)

Men's 400 m Freestyle
 Zoltán Szilágyi
 Preliminary heat – 03:58.94 (→ did not advance)

Men's 100 m Butterfly
 Zsolt Gáspár
 Preliminary heat – 53.29
 Semi-final – 53.45 (→ did not advance)

Men's 200 m Butterfly
 Viktor Bodrogi
 Preliminary heat – 02:00.75 (→ did not advance)

Men's 100 m Breaststroke
 Károly Güttler
 Preliminary heat – 01:01.66
 Semi-final – 01:01.83 (→ did not advance)

Men's 200 m Breaststroke
 Norbert Rózsa
 Preliminary heat – 02:15.27
 Semi-final – 02:14.67 (→ did not advance)

Men's 100 m Backstroke
 Péter Horváth
 Preliminary heat – 55.81
 Semi-final – 55.65 (→ did not advance)

Men's 200 m Backstroke
 Viktor Bodrogi
 Preliminary heat – DSQ (→ did not advance)

Men's 200 m Individual Medley
 Attila Czene
 Preliminary heat – 02:02.66
 Semi-final – 02:01.56
 Final – 02:01.16 (→ 4th place)

 István Batházi
 Preliminary heat – 02:03.63 (→ did not advance)

Men's 400 m Individual Medley
 István Batházi
 Preliminary heat – 04:18.85 (→ did not advance)

Men's 4 × 200 m Freestyle
 Attila Czene, Zsolt Gáspár, Jacint Simon, and Béla Szabados
 Preliminary heat – 07:24.48 (→ did not advance)

Men's 4 × 100 m Medley
 Péter Horváth, Károly Güttler, Zsolt Gáspár, and Attila Zubor
 Preliminary heat – 03:38.58
 Final – 03:39.09 (→ 5th place)

Women's 100 m Freestyle
 Gyongyver Lakos
 Preliminary heat – 57.71 (→ did not advance)

Women's 400 m Freestyle
 Éva Risztov
 Preliminary heat – 04:18.48 (→ did not advance)

Women's 800 m Freestyle
 Éva Risztov
 Preliminary heat – 08:43.07 (→ did not advance)

Women's 100 m Butterfly
 Orsolya Ferenczy
 Preliminary heat – 01:01.15 (→ did not advance)

Women's 200 m Butterfly
 Éva Risztov
 Preliminary heat – 02:11.32 (→ did not advance)

Women's 100 m Breaststroke
 Ágnes Kovács
 Preliminary heat – 01:08.50
 Semi-final – 01:07.79
 Final – 01:08.09 (→ 5th place)

Women's 200 m Breaststroke
 Ágnes Kovács
 Preliminary heat – 02:24.92
 Semi-final – 02:24.03 – Olympic Record
 Final – 02:24.35 (→  Gold Medal)

Women's 100 m Backstroke
 Annamaria Kiss
 Preliminary heat – 01:06.12 (→ did not advance)

Women's 200 m Backstroke
 Annamaria Kiss
 Preliminary heat – 02:20.40 (→ did not advance)

Women's 4 × 100 m Medley
 Orsolya Ferenczy, Annamaria Kiss, Ágnes Kovács, and Gyongyver Lakos
 Preliminary heat – 04:11.11 (→ did not advance)

Synchronized swimming

Duet
 Zsuzsanna Hamori, Petra Marschalko
 Technical routine – 28.957 Did not compete in free routine

Table tennis

Taekwondo

Tennis

Men's Singles Competition
 Attila Sávolt 
 First round – Lost to Paradorn Srichaphan (THA), 2-6 6-4 5–7

Alternates

Daniel Somogyi
Gergely Kisgyorgy

Women's Singles Competition
 Rita Kuti-Kis 
 First round – Lost to Amanda Coetzer (RSA), 1-6 1–6

 Petra Mandula 
 First round – Lost to Conchita Martínez (ESP), 1-6 0–6

 Katalin Marosi 
 First round – Lost to Monica Seles (USA), 0-6 1–6

Triathlon

Men's Individual Competition
 Csaba Kuttor – 1:51:05.74 (→ 30th place)

Women's Individual Competition
 Nora Edocseny – 2:05:20.03 (→ 19th place)
 Erika Molnar – 2:05:39.50 (→ 23rd place)
 Aniko Gog – 2:14:50.55 (→ 39th place)

Water polo

Men's team competition
 Preliminary round

 3-2-0
 Quarterfinals
 Defeated Italy (8-5)
 Semifinals
 Defeated Yugoslavia (8-7)
 Final
 Defeated Russia (13-6)

 Team roster
Tibor Benedek
Péter Biros
Rajmund Fodor
Tamás Kásás
Gergely Kiss
Zoltán Kósz
Tamás Märcz
Tamás Molnár
Barnabás Steinmetz
Zoltán Szécsi
Bulcsú Székely
Attila Vári
Zsolt Varga
Head coach: Dénes Kemény

Weightlifting

Men

Women

Wrestling

Notes

Wallechinsky, David (2004). The Complete Book of the Summer Olympics (Athens 2004 Edition). Toronto, Canada. . 
International Olympic Committee (2001). The Results. Retrieved 12 November 2005.
Sydney Organising Committee for the Olympic Games (2001). Official Report of the XXVII Olympiad Volume 1: Preparing for the Games. Retrieved 20 November 2005.
Sydney Organising Committee for the Olympic Games (2001). Official Report of the XXVII Olympiad Volume 2: Celebrating the Games. Retrieved 20 November 2005.
Sydney Organising Committee for the Olympic Games (2001). The Results. Retrieved 20 November 2005.
International Olympic Committee Web Site

References

O
Nations at the 2000 Summer Olympics
2000 Summer Olympics